Chrysocale principalis, the princely tiger moth, is a moth of the subfamily Arctiinae. It was described by Francis Walker in 1864. It is found in Mexico (Jalisco, Michoacán, Oaxaca, Tamaulipas) and Guatemala.

References

Euchromiina
Moths described in 1864